Elizabeth Jane Kelsey is a New Zealand academic and activist who has promoted critical examination of the relationship between social, political and economic issues and how these can impact on human rights and justice.  Specifically, within the New Zealand context, she has advocated public policy positions on colonialism and te Tiriti Waitangi, globalisation and neoliberalism, and the role of universities as public institutions. She has published widely on these and other issues, and in 2020 won the Global category of the New Zealand Women of Influence Award. Kelsey was professor of law at the University of Auckland until her retirement in 2022.

Education
Jane Kelsey has an LL.B. (Hons) from Victoria University of Wellington, BCL from Oxford University, MPhil from the University of Cambridge. In 1991 she completed a PhD from the University of Auckland, titled Rogernomics and the Treaty of Waitangi: the contradiction between the economic and Treaty policies of the fourth Labour government, 1984-1990, and the role of law in mediating that contradiction in the interests of the colonial capitalist state. She has worked at the University of Auckland since 1979 and was appointed to a personal Chair in Law in 1997.

Associations
She is a key member of the Action Resource Education Network of Aotearoa (Arena), and is actively involved in researching and speaking out against the World Trade Organization, the International Monetary Fund, free trade and corporate-led globalisation. She is also actively involved in campaigning for the New Zealand Government's full recognition of the Treaty of Waitangi and opposed the controversial seabed and foreshore legislation.

Kelsey is an outspoken critic of the Trans-Pacific Partnership free trade talks, of which New Zealand is a part.

Kelsey took part in demonstrations over the 1981 Springbok tour.

In 2020, Kelsey won the Global category of the New Zealand Women of Influence Awards.

See also
 Alter-globalization
 Anti-globalization movement

Publications 
Economic Fundamentalism - The New Zealand Experiment: A world model for structural adjustment?. London and East Haven: Pluto Press, 1995
Reclaiming the Future: New Zealand and the Global Economy. Bridget Williams Books Ltd. 1999
No Ordinary Deal: Unmasking the Trans-Pacific Partnership Free Trade Agreement. ed.. Bridget Williams Books Ltd. 2010
The Fire Economy: New Zealand's Reckoning. Bridget Williams Books Ltd, 2015

References

External links
 Jane Kelsey's profile at the University of Auckland
 Video of Jane Kelsey speaking out against Philippines President Gloria Arroyo
 Rogernomics and the Treaty of Waitangi: the contradiction between the economic and Treaty policies of the fourth Labour government, 1984-1990, and the role of law in mediating that contradiction in the interests of the colonial capitalist state. Kelsey's PhD thesis

Academic staff of the University of Auckland
New Zealand legal scholars
Year of birth missing (living people)
Living people
Legal educators
New Zealand women lawyers
20th-century New Zealand lawyers
21st-century New Zealand lawyers
Women legal scholars
20th-century women lawyers
21st-century women lawyers
New Zealand Women of Influence Award recipients